The London Film Critics Circle Award for British Supporting Actress of the Year in an annual award given by the London Film Critics Circle.

Winners

1990s

2000s

2010s

Film awards for supporting actress
A